Ranjiaba  is a station on Line 5, Line 6, and the Loop Line of Chongqing Rail Transit in Chongqing Municipality, China. It is located in Yubei District and serves its surrounding area, including nearby office towers, residential blocks and a mall.

It opened on January 20, 2013, with Line 6. Line 5 services were later added on December 28, 2017. The station expanded exactly one year later with the opening of the Loop Line section of the station on December 28, 2018.

Station structure

A total of 2 island platforms are used for Line 5 and Line 6 trains travelling in both directions. These 2 platforms were designed with cross-platform interchange in mind and were built during the construction of Line 6. Spaces on the opposite end of the platforms were reserved for Line 5 at the time and came into use when the metro line became operational in 2017.

There are 2 side platforms for Loop Line trains.

References

Railway stations in Chongqing
Railway stations in China opened in 2013
Chongqing Rail Transit stations